Koen Persoons (born 12 July 1983) is a Belgian former professional footballer who is the Head of Football for the Club Brugge youth academy outfit Club NXT. He is a defensive midfielder.

Career
Persoons made his first team debut with Eendracht Aalst. When the team went bankrupt, he signed for Aalst rivals FC Denderleeuw, who became FCV Dender after their merge with Verbroedering Denderhoutem. He became popular quite quickly, and was even nicknamed Biglia by his coach Jean-Pierre Vande Velde. Even though Dender became Belgian Second Division champions in 2007, Persoons chose to sign for KV Mechelen who were also playing in Second Division. As KV Mechelen won the playoffs a few weeks later, they promoted toger with Dender to the highest level of Belgian football. Persoons retired from his playing career at the end of the 2021-22 season.

Post-playing Career
On 5 June 2022, Club Brugge announced that Persoons had been appointed Head of Football for the club's youth setup, Club NXT.

Honours
Lokeren
Belgian Cup: 2011–12, 2013–14

References

External links
 Koen Persoons player info at the official KV Mechelen website 
 Koen Persoons player info at sporza.be 
 

1983 births
Living people
Sportspeople from Aalst, Belgium
Footballers from East Flanders
Belgian footballers
Belgian Pro League players
Challenger Pro League players
Association football midfielders
F.C.V. Dender E.H. players
K.V. Mechelen players
K.S.C. Lokeren Oost-Vlaanderen players
Oud-Heverlee Leuven players
K.V.K. Ninove players